Jon Craig Ford (born May 21, 1968) was an Independent member of the Alabama House of Representatives. He was the House Minority Leader from 2010 to 2016.

Personal life and education
Ford graduated from Auburn University in 1991, with a degree in marketing. His wife, Gwen Glover, teaches at Gadsden State Community College. Ford's father, Joe Ford, served in the Alabama House for 26 years.

Career
Ford was elected to the Alabama House in 2000, succeeding his father. In 2010, Ford was elected House Minority Leader. Ford serves on the Ways and Means - Education Committee, and the Commerce and Small Business Committee. Ford considered running for governor in 2014.

Ford has proposed repealing the Alabama Accountability Act, proposing instead to spend more money on  Alabama's Pre-K program and the Alabama Math Science and Technology Initiative. Ford has led an effort to introduce a state lottery, with the revenue going to education spending.

Ford was among the first lawmakers to call for former Alabama Governor Robert Bentley to resign or be impeached for misusing taxpayer dollars and state resources. Ford also stood up to the Democratic Party's leadership and called for their resignation in light of their own failed leadership and accusations of corruption.

March 2018, Ford announced he is running in Alabama Senate District 10 as an Independent, a seat held by Sen. Phil Williams of Rainbow City, who is not seeking reelection.

Ford co-owns Hodges-Ford Insurance, as well as The Messenger, a weekly newspaper. Ford serves as a captain in the Alabama Army National Guard.

References

External links
 Vote Smart page
 An interview regarding the Accountability Act

1968 births
Alabama Independents
Auburn University alumni
Businesspeople from Alabama
Editors of Alabama newspapers
Living people
Members of the Alabama House of Representatives
Military personnel from Alabama
People from Gadsden, Alabama
21st-century American politicians